CBGB Forever is a compilation album produced by Josh Abraham. It is named after the theater in New York, New York. It consists mainly of rare songs, hits, and covers. Artists include Green Day, Blondie, Foo Fighters, Ramones, U2, Talking Heads, Good Charlotte, Patti Smith Group, Rancid, The Damned, Audioslave, The Chesterfield Kings, Velvet Revolver, and The Dead Boys. It was released May 15, 2007 by Wicked Cool Records.

References

2007 compilation albums
Punk rock compilation albums
Pop punk compilation albums